The 2014–15 Nemzeti Bajnokság II football season was a single sixteen-team league, unlike previous years, which had two geographically-based sixteen-team groups. Kaposvár and Mezőkövesd were relegated from the 2013–14 Nemzeti Bajnokság I.

Teams

Stadium and locations
Following is the list of clubs competing in 2014–15 Nemzeti Bajnokság II, with their location, stadium and stadium capacity.

Personnel and kits
Following is the list of clubs competing in 2013–14 Nemzeti Bajnokság II, with their manager, captain, kit manufacturer and shirt sponsor.

League table

Positions by round

Results

Top goalscorers

Updated to games played on 22 November 2014

References

External links
  

Nemzeti Bajnokság II seasons
2014–15 in Hungarian football
Hun